Justice Munson may refer to:

Loveland Munson (1843–1921), chief justice of the Vermont Supreme Court
Lyman E. Munson (1822–1908), associate justice of the Montana Supreme Court